Cornfeld is a surname. Notable people with the surname include:
 Bernard Cornfeld (1927–1995), prominent businessman and international financier
 Leslie Cornfeld, Federal Prosecutor and Deputy Chief for the US Attorney's Office, New York Eastern District
 Stuart Cornfeld, film producer

See also
 Cornfield (surname)
 Kornfeld
 Kornfield

German-language surnames
Jewish surnames